Erika Alcocer Luna (born on July 19, 1974 in Tampico, Tamaulipas, Mexico) she is a Mexican singer. She is the winner of the Second Edition of the reality show La Academia, produced by TV Azteca. She also participated in the Mexican edition of La Voz.

She is known for her powerful voice in the style of power ballad and R&B tunes in Spanish. 
Her debut album “Devuelveme la Vida” by Warner Music Mexico hit the charts and quickly became gold disc for over 75,000 copies sold.

Career

Singles

References

External links 
La Academia Season 2
 Erika's Official Website

1974 births
Living people
La Academia winners
La Academia contestants
People from Tampico, Tamaulipas
21st-century Mexican singers
21st-century Mexican women singers
Women in Latin music